Czech Republic women's under-19 national floorball team is the national floorball team of the Czech Republic. , the team was ranked fourth by the International Floorball Federation.

References 

Floorball in the Czech Republic
Women's national under-19 floorball teams
Floorball